Weerriba is a rural locality in the Livingstone Shire, Queensland, Australia.

Geography
Waterpark Creek enters from the north-west and flows through to form part of the southern boundary. Sandy Creek, a tributary of Waterpark, forms the south-eastern boundary.

References 

Shire of Livingstone
Localities in Queensland